Chantelle Cameron (born 14 May 1991) is a British professional boxer. She is a world champion in two weight classes and the current undisputed light-welterweight champion, having held the WBC title since 2020; the IBF and Ring magazine titles since 2021; and the WBA and WBO titles since November 2022. She previously held the IBO female lightweight title from 2017 to 2019.

As an amateur, she won a silver medal in the light-welterweight division at the 2010 EU Championships in Keszthely, Hungary, and a bronze in the lightweight division at the 2011 EU Championships in Katowice, Poland, losing to Ireland's Katie Taylor in the semi-finals.

Early life 
Chantelle Cameron was born on 14 May 1991, in Northampton, England. She credits her love for combat sports to watching films starring Jean-Claude Van Damme and television programme Buffy the Vampire Slayer, stating: "I loved all those fighting films. Kickboxer would have to be my favourite Van Damme film. The fighting in it is unreal. I loved Buffy because of the fight scenes and the fact she was a female role model." Cameron's introduction to combat sports was through kickboxing at the age of 10, moving on to Muay Thai at 16. After a successful amateur career—in which she remained undefeated, winning amateur titles in the IKF and WAKO—she switched to boxing at the age of 18.

Amateur career

Cameron won two English women's national championships; the ABA Championships in 2010, and the ABAE Championships in 2015. She reached the quarter-finals of the 2010 AIBA World Championships, losing to eventual silver medalist Vera Slugina of Russia. She also won a silver medal at the 2010 EU Championships, and bronze the following year at the 2011 EU Championships, losing in the semi-finals to eventual winner Katie Taylor of Ireland.

Results

2010 | ABA Women's National Championships (63.5 kg)

Defeated Anastasia Cousins 40–15
Defeated Nina Meinke 17–16
Defeated Alanna Murphy 27–15

2010 | European Union Women's Championships (64 kg)

Defeated Nikolett Papp (Hungary) ?–?
Defeated Margarita Cheneva (Bulgaria) ?–?
Lost to Gulsum Tatar (Turkey) 0–4

2010 | AIBA Women's World Championships (64 kg)

Defeated Iulia Novacioiu (Romania) 12–3
Defeated Rebecca Price (Wales) 7–5
Lost to Vera Slugina (Russia) 4–16

2011 | European Union Women's Championships (60 kg)

Defeated Marija Zovko (Croatia) 30–7
Defeated Jennifer Miranda (Spain) 19–9
Lost to Katie Taylor (Ireland) 10–28

2015 | ABAE Women's National Championships (60 kg)

Defeated Hatty Nylon 3–0
Defeated Sophie Colbourne 3–0

Professional career

Super-featherweight 
In 2017, Cameron signed a promotional contract with Barry McGuigan's Cyclone Promotions. Under the guidance of Barry's son, Shane McGuigan, she made her professional debut on 26 May 2017, winning a six-round points decision (PTS) against Karina Kopinska at the Motorpoint Arena in Cardiff, Wales.

After scoring technical knockout (TKO) wins over Bojana Libiszewska and Bilitis Gaucher in July and October respectively, Cameron fought Edith Ramos for the vacant IBO Inter-Continental female super-featherweight title on 11 November 2017 at the Royal Highland Centre in Edinburgh, Scotland, winning via third-round TKO.

Lightweight

IBO champion 
A month later on 2 December, Cameron moved up a weight class to fight for her first world title, in her fifth fight, against Viviane Obenauf at the Leicester Arena in Leicester. She won by sixth-round stoppage via corner retirement (RTD) after Obenauf's corner called off the fight between rounds, capturing the IBO female lightweight title. The first defence of her title came on 3 March 2018, against Myriam Dellal at The SSE Hydro in Glasgow, Scotland. She successfully retained her title via shutout unanimous decision (UD) over ten rounds, with all three judges scoring the bout 100–90 in favour of Cameron. She next scored a sixth-round TKO win in June over Natalia Vanesa del Valle Aguirre in a non-title fight, before making a second defence against Jessica Gonzalez on 13 October at the York Hall in London, with the vacant WBC Silver female lightweight title also on the line. Throughout the fight Cameron used footwork and stayed behind the jab, landing straight right hands and uppercuts on her opponent. Gonzalez was down on the canvas in the first-round, only for referee Ian John Lewis to rule it a slip. The Mexican fighter suffered a cut in the second-round from an accidental clash of heads. In the ninth, Gonzalez was deducted a point for hitting Cameron in the back of the head, while in a clinch, after the referee had called for the fighters to separate. Cameron won via shutout UD with the judges' scorecards reading 100–89, 100–88, and 100–88, retaining her IBO title and capturing the vacant WBC Silver title.

In February 2019, Cameron announced on Twitter she had left Cyclone Promotions and trainer Shane McGuigan, stating, "...they know the distress they have caused me and how isolated they made me feel, humiliated and just deflated, they had no time for a female boxer", as well as citing training issues; "My last fight camp was four weeks and I'm sick of the circumstances of chasing money and it's been seen in my most recent performance (Jessica Gonzalez)". She has since joined up with MTK Global and trainer Jamie Moore.

Further world title ambitions 
Her first fight under MTK came in April, winning via second-round TKO in a non-title bout against Feriche Mashauri. This was followed by another non-title bout in May, again winning by second-round TKO against Vaida Masiokaite. Following her win over Masiokaite, Cameron relinquished her IBO title, saying, "I wish to thank the IBO for their support and introducing me to the world stage as a major force in women's boxing. I will relinquish my IBO title to enable other female fighters to fight for this important title and to enhance their careers as well."

Her next fight was against Anisha Basheel in a WBC lightweight final eliminator on 20 July at the Brentwood Centre in Essex, England. Cameron's WBC Silver title was on the line with the winner gaining a chance to face WBA, WBC, IBF, WBO, and The Ring champion Katie Taylor for the undisputed female lightweight title. In a fight that outlets described as a dominant performance, Cameron scored a UD victory. Keeping behind the jab for the first few rounds, Basheel appeared to have trouble figuring out the former champion. Cameron stepped up the pressure from round five and onwards, unloading power punches in combinations and landing at will, rarely troubled by her opponent. Two judges scored the bout 100–89, while the third scored it 100–90, securing Cameron a mandatory shot at Katie Taylor.

Light-welterweight 
For her next fight, Cameron moved up another weight class to face former three-weight world champion Anahí Ester Sánchez. Cameron said on the decision to move up in weight, "I am not waiting around for Katie Taylor. That's why I have moved up in weight for this final eliminator, because I want to face any world champion." The fight took place on 9 November 2019 at the York Hall, in what was a WBC light-welterweight final eliminator, with the winner earning a chance to face unified WBA and WBC champion Jessica McCaskill. After knocking Sanchez down in the ninth-round, Cameron went on to win the fight by UD to claim the WBC mandatory position in a second weight class. Two judges scored the bout 100–89 while the third scored it 99–90.

It was announced in July 2020 that Cameron signed a multi-fight promotional contract with Eddie Hearn's Matchroom Sport.

WBC champion vs. Araújo, Hernández
In early September 2020, it was revealed that the WBC had approved Cameron to face 2012 Olympic bronze medalist Adriana Araújo for the  WBC female light-welterweight title, which McCaskill relinquished in order to defeat Cecilia Brækhus to become the undisputed female welterweight champion. On 15 September, Cameron's new promoter, Eddie Hearn, announced that the bout will take place on 4 October, with a venue yet to be announced. Cameron said of the match up, "This chance I've been given is huge, I've finally got the platform to make myself a star. I won't take my opportunity for granted and will be taking every precaution to ensure I use this chance to shine. I want to make my dreams come true to unify and become a world champion with all of the belts, not just one."

With the Marshall Arena in Milton Keynes being chosen as the venue, Araújo failed to make weight at the pre-fight weigh-in—weighing  over the  light-welterweight limit—meaning the vacant title would only be on the line for Cameron. After staying behind the jab and following up with combination punches for ten rounds, with Araújo offering little resistance, Cameron won by a shutout UD in what outlets described as a dominant win. All three judges scored the bout 100–90 to award Cameron her first major world title.

In January 2021, it was announced that Cameron would make the first defence of her WBC title against former world champion Melissa Hernández, with the bout scheduled to take place on 20 March as part of the undercard for Lawrence Okolie's world title fight against Krzysztof Głowacki at a venue yet to be named. After Cameron suffered a hand injury during training, the bout was rescheduled to 29 May and took place at the Michelob Ultra Arena in Paradise, Nevada, as part of the undercard of the Devin Haney vs. Jorge Linares world title fight. Cameron landed a flurry of punches in the fourth round, sending her opponent reeling into the ropes. Referee Celestino Ruiz determined that the ropes had held Hernández up and issued a standing eight count, giving Cameron a 10–8 round. In the next round, after Cameron landed another flurry of punches with no response from Hernández, Ruiz stepped in and called a halt to the contest at 1 minute and 38 seconds into the round to award Cameron a fifth-round TKO victory.

Unification vs. McGee

In September 2021, it was announced that Cameron would put her title on the line in a unification bout against IBF female light-welterweight champion Mary McGee, with the inaugural Ring title also on the line. The bout took place on 30 October at The O2 Arena, with Cameron emerging victorious via UD. The judges' scorecards reading 100–90, 99–91 and 99–92.

Undisputed World Champion
In November 2022, Cameron defeated Jessica McCaskill in a match held in Abu Dhabi, making Cameron the undisputed world light-welterweight champion and the United Kingdom’s first undisputed female boxing world champion.

Cameron vs Taylor
On March 2, Cameron accepted a public challenge from undisputed lightweight champion Katie Taylor for a fight for Cameron's undisputed super-lightweight titles. The bout was subsequently announced by Eddie Hearn on March 11 to be taking place at the 3Arena in Dublin on May 20.

Professional boxing record

References

External links

 

|-

|-

|-

|-

|-

|-

|-

1991 births
Living people
English women boxers
Sportspeople from Northampton
Super-featherweight boxers
Lightweight boxers
World light-welterweight boxing champions
International Boxing Organization champions
World Boxing Council champions
International Boxing Federation champions
The Ring (magazine) champions
World Boxing Association champions
World Boxing Organization champions